Delbert Henry Brenner (July 18, 1887 – April 11, 1971) was a Major League Baseball pitcher who played for one season. He played for the Cleveland Naps from September 21, 1912, to October 5, 1912.

In 1926, he managed the Columbia Comers of the South Atlantic League.

External links

1887 births
1971 deaths
Baseball players from Minnesota
Cleveland Naps players
Major League Baseball pitchers
Minor league baseball managers
New Orleans Pelicans (baseball) players
Omaha Rourkes players